HMS Devonshire was the first of the  destroyers and the first Batch 1 ship of the Royal Navy. The ship was built by Cammell Laird in Birkenhead near Liverpool. With a displacement of 5,440 tonnes (6,850 tonnes full load), Devonshire was named after the English county of Devon. She was launched on 10 June 1960 and delivered to the navy two years later.

Operational service

In 1962 Devonshire was commissioned and became the first operational Royal Navy ship to fire the Seaslug missile. Following work up, she sailed for the Mediterranean, followed by a return to her home port of Portsmouth.  From here she then sailed for Bermuda and the United States.  She returned to Portsmouth just before the end of 1962.
Captain George Cunningham Leslie OBE, served as Commanding officer from 1965 to 1966.

On 31 August 1966, Devonshire collided with the tanker British Sovereign off the mouth of the River Elbe. No-one was injured on either ship.

Captain Peter Buchanan served as Commanding Officer from 1973 to 1974. Devonshire was involved in patrol duties in the Persian Gulf and the Caribbean Sea, but was not involved in any armed conflict of the United Kingdom. Like the other first batch of County-class ships, Devonshire was fitted with the Seaslug anti aircraft missile defence system. She attended the 1977 Silver Jubilee Fleet Review off Spithead when she was part of the First Flotilla.

Decommissioning and disposal
Devonshire was decommissioned under defence cuts in 1978, though was immediately offered for sale to Egypt, but the sale did not go through.

References

Publications
 
  Marriott, Leo, Royal Navy Destroyers since 1945, Ian Allan, 
  McCart, Neil, 2014. County Class Guided Missile Destroyers, Maritime Books.

External links

firing of Seaslug from HMS Devonshire

 

County-class destroyers of the Royal Navy
Ships built on the River Mersey
1960 ships
Cold War destroyers of the United Kingdom
Maritime incidents in 1984